Orocrambus haplotomus is a moth in the family Crambidae. It was described by Edward Meyrick in 1883. This species is endemic to New Zealand. O. haplotomus has been recorded from the areas around Lake Te Anau and Lake Wakatipu in the South Island.

The wingspan is 19–28 mm for males and 25–30 mm for females.

References

Crambinae
Moths described in 1883
Moths of New Zealand
Endemic fauna of New Zealand
Taxa named by Edward Meyrick
Endemic moths of New Zealand